The 2017 Albanian Cup Final was a football match played on 31 May 2017 to decide the winner of the 2016–17 Albanian Cup, the 65th edition of Albania's primary football cup.

The match was between Skënderbeu and Tirana at the Elbasan Arena in Elbasan.

Tirana, already relegated for the first time in history, won the final 3–1 after extra-time for their 11th Albanian Cup title.

Background
Skënderbeu had previously played in 5 Albanian Cup finals, failing to win any of these. Meanwhile, Tirana had played 23 finals, winning a record 15.

Match

Details

References

Cup Final
2017
Albanian Cup
Football in Elbasan
2010s in Elbasan
Sports competitions in Elbasan
Albanian Cup Final, 2017
Albanian Cup Final, 2017